Mohamed Mohamed Zuhair, PC (born 11 June 1947) is a President's Counsel and a former Member of Parliament from the People's Alliance national list from 1990 to 2000.

Career 
He studied at Zahira College.

Zuhair became a Member of Parliament from the People's Alliance National List in the Government of Kumaratunga and he served as MP from 1990 to 2000.

Following the victory of Mahinda Rajapaksa at the Presidential Election, he was appointed as Chairman of state-owned Media Rupavahini Corporation.

During his tenure as an Ambassador to Iran, he played key role in arranging an Iranian credit line that helped Sri Lanka to obtain fuel supplies on concessionary terms at a critical stage of the war against the LTTE.

Zuhair qualified at the G C E (Advanced Level) in 1965 from Zahira College, Colombo and entered the Sri Lanka Law College in 1968 where he won the Asia Foundation Scholarship. He passed out as an Advocate in 1970 and was enrolled as an Advocate of the Supreme Court in 1972.

Zuhair was encouraged by the then Senior State Counsel, later Justice P. Ramanathan of the Supreme Court, to join the Attorney-General’s Department as a State Counsel, which he joined in 1973. He served the State for nearly ten years, firstly as a State Counsel, in the civil division for five years and as a Senior State Counsel and prosecutor in the criminal division during the next five years. He appeared for the State in a large number of cases both civil and criminal. He prosecuted in the High Court in murder cases and appeared in criminal appeals in the Appellate Courts. In 1983, he resigned as Senior State Counsel and reverted to private practice. 

From 1994 to 2000 Zuhair was a Member of Parliament on the Peoples’ Alliance National List in the Chandrika Bandaranaike Kumaratunga government nominated by the Sri Lanka Muslim Congress (SLMC). In 2001, he was appointed a President’s Counsel.

From 2004 to 2005, Zuhair served as Chairman of the Board of Governors of Zahira College while serving during the same period as the Chairman of the Sri Lanka Rupavahini Corporation. 

In 2006, Mr Zuhair was appointed Sri Lanka’s Ambassador to the Islamic Republic of Iran where he served the country till 2012. The interest-free oil package that he successfully negotiated for Sri Lanka with the then Iranian government headed by President Mahmoud Ahmedinejad brought into the Sri Lankan government coffers from January 2008 onwards, much needed Iranian funds aggregating by August 2008 to US $ 675 million, helping substantially the cash stricken Sri Lankan government.

M M Zuhair is also a reputed speaker and a prolific writer.

References 

1947 births
Members of the 10th Parliament of Sri Lanka
Living people
Alumni of Zahira College, Colombo
20th-century Sri Lankan lawyers
20th-century Sri Lankan politicians
21st-century Sri Lankan lawyers
21st-century Sri Lankan politicians